George Kynoch (22 August 1834 – 28 February 1891) was the founder of IMI plc, one of the United Kingdom's largest engineering businesses.

Biography
George Kynoch was born at Peterhead in Aberdeenshire and educated at the local school. He first worked as an insurance clerk in Glasgow and then as a bank clerk in Worcester. 

After working for a while at larger bank branch in Birmingham, in 1856 he decided to join Pursall & Phillips, percussion cap manufacturers, in Birmingham. An explosion in 1859 destroyed the works, killing 19 of the 70 employees. As a result the firm moved to on four acres of land  at Witton in 1862. 

In 1863, Kynoch took over the business, which was subsequently renamed G. Kynoch and Co. The Lion Works, as it became known, quickly secured contracts to supply ammunition to the British and Turkish Governments. In 1884 his interests were bought out and he was simply employed as Managing Director.

In 1886, he became Member of Parliament for Aston Manor and in 1887 he was appointed President of Aston Villa Football Club. These roles distracted him from his business and in 1888 he was forced to resign.

Personal life 
In 1863, he married Helen Birley. They later separated.

Death 
He emigrated to South Africa and died in Johannesburg in 1891, aged 56.

References

External links 

1834 births
1891 deaths
People from Peterhead
Conservative Party (UK) MPs for English constituencies
UK MPs 1886–1892
British businesspeople in the armaments industry
Scottish emigrants to South Africa
Businesspeople from Birmingham, West Midlands
19th-century Scottish businesspeople
19th-century English businesspeople